Joseph Edward Smith (1886 – unknown) was an English footballer who played for Hull City, Everton and Bury in the Football League.

References

1886 births
English footballers
Association football forwards
West Stanley F.C. players
Hull City A.F.C. players
Everton F.C. players
Lisburn Distillery F.C. players
Bury F.C. players
English Football League players
Year of death missing
People from South Moor
Footballers from County Durham